The 2009 Rai Open was a professional tennis tournament played on outdoor red clay courts. It was part of the 2009 ATP Challenger Tour. It took place in Rome, Italy between 13 and 18 April 2009.

Singles entrants

Seeds

 Rankings are as of April 6, 2009.

Other entrants
The following players received wildcards into the singles main draw:
  Daniele Bracciali
  Thomas Fabbiano
  Gianluca Naso
  Filippo Volandri

The following players received entry from the qualifying draw:
  Andrea Arnaboldi
  Thierry Ascione
  Eric Gomes
  Giancarlo Petrazzuolo
  Stefano Galvani (as a Lucky loser)

The following player received special exempt into the main draw:
  Alessio di Mauro
  Antonio Veić

Champions

Men's singles

 Sebastián Decoud def.  Simon Greul, 7–6(2), 6–1

Men's doubles

 Simon Greul /  Alessandro Motti def.  Daniele Bracciali /  Filippo Volandri, 6–4, 7–5

References
2009 Draws
Italian Tennis Federation official website
ITF search 

Rai Open
Rai Open